Eudoxie Laurent, real name Eudoxie Louise Laurence Yvos, (30 July 1831 – 15 September 1890) was a 19th-century French actress and singer.

Biography 
She appeared, among other, in Un oncle aux carottes by Albert Monnier and Édouard Martin on the stage of the théâtre des Variétés (1854) in the part of Nichette then in Les Fils de Charles Quint by Victor Séjour at the théâtre de l'Ambigu-Comique (1864) and in Histoire d'un drapeau by Adolphe d'Ennery (1865).

An actress in the troupe of the théâtre de la Porte-Saint-Martin, she married the playwright Amédée de Jallais in 1862. After she performed at Bobino (1865) and at the Théâtre des Nouveautés (1867), she became a star at the Alcazar d'Été in 1869.

After major roles at the théâtre du Châtelet (La Faridondaine) (1873) and in 1876 at the Théâtre Historique in a revival of La Bergère des Alpes by Marmontel and in full popularity, she must leave the theater because of an illness she died of in 1890.

Bibliography 
 Émile Abraham, Les Acteurs et les actrices de Paris, 1858, (p. 98)
 Henry Lyonnet, Dictionnaire des comédiens français, 1911, (p. 310)

References

External links 
 Eudoxie Laurent sur le site des Cahiers de la chanson
 Eudoxie Laurent sur Musée de la Chanson

19th-century French actresses
French stage actresses
19th-century French singers
1831 births
People from La Rochelle
1890 deaths